Number Ones is a greatest hits album by American singer Michael Jackson. It was released on November 18, 2003, by Epic Records. Number Ones was Jackson's first proper compilation album with Epic Records, after the release of the first disc of HIStory: Past, Present and Future, Book I in 1995 (and after the re-release of that disc as a single album titled Greatest Hits: HIStory, Volume I in 2001). The album included Jackson's singles that reportedly reached number 1 in charts around the world, hence the album's name. Number Ones also features the last original single released during Jackson's lifetime, "One More Chance", released four days after the release of the album.

Number Ones was successful around the world, originally reaching number one in the United Kingdom, among other countries. The album eventually returned to the top spot in the UK after Jackson's sudden death in 2009, and became the number one selling album in the United States for six non-consecutive weeks and stayed at number one for twenty-seven weeks on the US Top Pop Catalog Albums chart that year. However, as a 'catalog' title, initially Number Ones was excluded from the Billboard 200, the main albums chart in the United States, denying Jackson a seventh solo number one album on the chart. The rules preventing titles older than 18 months to chart on the Billboard 200 were subsequently changed in the fall of 2009 due to the posthumous success of Jackson, as well as The Beatles re-mastered re-releases.

With Number Ones, Jackson was the first artist to sell more than one million music downloads in one week. The album was also the third best-selling album of 2009 in the United States according to Nielsen Soundscan and ninth best-selling worldwide according to IFPI. By 2021, Number Ones was certified 5× Platinum by the Recording Industry Association of America (RIAA). At the 2009 American Music Awards, it won two awards - Favorite Pop/Rock Album and Favorite Soul/R&B Album. One of the best-selling albums of the 21st century, the compilation managed to sell over 10 million copies worldwide.

Background
In 2003, Sony released Number Ones, which was different from Greatest Hits: HIStory, Volume I in several ways. The latter sold over 5 million copies, comprised fifteen singles (fourteen of them Billboard Hot 100 Top 10 hits): three from Off the Wall, five from Thriller, four from Bad and three from Dangerous. The versions of those songs were included exactly as they appeared on the original albums, whereas Number Ones included radio edits, single versions, and new edits. Number Ones also offered singles from the second disc of HIStory: Past, Present and Future, Book I, plus the title track from Blood on the Dance Floor: HIStory in the Mix and "You Rock My World", the hit single from Invincible. The album also included two other tracks: "Break of Dawn" (a song from Invincible that Jackson planned to release as a single) and the new, previously unreleased single, "One More Chance", which became the final hit single during his lifetime. The beat-heavy ballad "One More Chance", which was written for Jackson by R. Kelly, was recorded for this collection. The U.S. release also included another track, a live rendition of "Ben".

There were four covers for the Number Ones album: a pose from the "Bad" music video, a pose from a photo session for the "Off the Wall" album cover, a pose where he is suspended on his toes while performing "Billie Jean", and the final cover shows him holding his signature fedora, in the midst of a kick (from "Black or White").

Impact of album after death
Number Ones had already sold 1,825,000 copies in the US the week Jackson died. Following Jackson's death on June 25, the album sold 108,000 units in the US on the chart week ending July 1, 2009 and was the biggest-selling album of the week, though only one quarter of Jackson's entire US album sales recorded that week, shifting just under 425,000 albums and 2.6 million digital singles (more than 50 times of all the combined digital single sales of the previous week and making Jackson the first artist to sell more than one million downloads in one week). The following week it remained the biggest selling album shifting its largest one-week sales since being released in 2003 with 350,000 copies sold, as Jackson's overall album sales tally swelled to 1.1 million for the week. Number Ones was 2009's third biggest-selling album according to SoundScan, behind Susan Boyle's I Dreamed a Dream and Taylor Swift's Fearless. Although the best selling album for three weeks in a row, the record was not allowed to chart on the Billboard 200 due to (now defunct) rules, but entered the Comprehensive Chart at number 1 where it remained for six weeks. Number Ones was the best-selling album in the United States for six consecutive weeks amassing sales of 2.36 million by the end of 2009. The Billboard Catalog chart also allowed Number Ones to chart, where it led Jackson in occupying the entire top 12 positions on the chart. Number Ones has topped Top Catalog Albums Chart several times; most recently for three consecutive weeks in May and June 2014. As of July 29, 2016, the album has sold over 5.3 million copies in the US. Number Ones is Jackson’s best-selling hits package in the Nielsen era (1991-present), and third-biggest seller overall in that period (behind Thriller, with 6.7 million, and Dangerous, with 6.5 million).

In the UK, Ireland and Canada, the album re-entered the UK charts at number 1 the week following Jackson's death.

In New Zealand, Number Ones re-entered the chart following Jackson's death at number 38, climbing to number 4 the following week. It then reached number 1 the next week; the album was also certified 4× Platinum, shipping over 60,000 copies.

Track listing
The songs included on each international version and format are summarised below, sortable using the position within an edition.

Charts

Weekly charts

Year-end charts

Decade-end charts

Certifications and sales

See also
 Number Ones DVD
 List of best-selling singles and albums of 2003 in Ireland
 List of best-selling albums of the 2000s (decade) in the United Kingdom
 List of best-selling albums of the 2000s (century) in the United Kingdom

References

2003 greatest hits albums
Michael Jackson compilation albums
Albums produced by Michael Jackson
Albums produced by Quincy Jones
Albums produced by Teddy Riley
Albums produced by R. Kelly
Albums produced by Rodney Jerkins
Epic Records compilation albums
Compilation albums of number-one songs